The Peculiar People were a Christian movement that was originally an offshoot of the Wesleyan denomination, founded in 1838 in Rochford, Essex, by James Banyard, a farm-worker's son born in 1800. They derive their name from a term of praise found in both the Old Testament and the New Testament of the King James Bible, in Deuteronomy and 1 Peter.

In the King James Version of the Bible, first published in 1611, Deuteronomy 14:2 includes the verse "For thou art an holy people unto the Lord thy God, and the Lord hath chosen thee to be a peculiar people unto himself, above all the nations that are upon the earth.", and 1 Peter 2:9 reads "But ye are a chosen generation, a royal priesthood, an holy nation, a peculiar people; that ye should shew forth the praises of him who hath called you out of darkness into his marvellous light."

The Peculiar People is also a phrase used to describe the Quakers, which they adopted with some pride.

Foundation and spread

Banyard was frequently drunk until his wife asked him to attend a service in the local Wesleyan Methodist chapel. The preacher's message had a profound effect on Banyard, to the extent that he became teetotal and regularly attended the church. Before long he became a reputable preacher on the Wesleyan circuit. In 1837 he and William Bridges took a lease on an old workhouse at Rochford which became the first chapel of their new group, which Banyard and Bridges called the Peculiar People, a name taken from Deuteronomy 14:2 and 1 Peter 2:9.

The grave of James Banyard can still be seen in the churchyard of St Andrew's Rochford.

In the mid-1850s the Peculiar People spread deeper into Essex, much of which was agricultural land occupied by a naturally conservative population. The Peculiar People preached a puritanical form of Christianity which proved popular, and numerous chapels sprang up throughout rural Essex. They also practised faith healing.

There is an account of the Peculiars in 19th-century Plumstead in Unorthodox London by Charles Maurice Davies. In Blunt's Dictionary of Sects and Heresies (1874), the Peculiars were described as 'a sect of very ignorant people'.

The Peculiar People practised a lively form of worship and considered themselves bound by the literal interpretation of the King James Bible. They did not seek immediate medical care in cases of sickness, instead relying on prayer as an act of faith. This led to judicial criticism when children died due to lack of treatment. In response to the concern about refusing medical care, which led to some parents being imprisoned after a 1910 diphtheria outbreak in Essex, the sect split between the 'Old Peculiars', who still rebuffed medicine, and the 'New Peculiars', who somewhat reluctantly condoned it. The split healed in the 1930s, when in general the New Peculiar position prevailed. During the two world wars, some Peculiar People were conscientious objectors, believing as they still do that war is contrary to the teachings of Jesus Christ.

Union of Evangelical Churches
Church membership had peaked in the 1850s with 43 chapels, but it declined until 1956, when the Peculiar People changed their name to the less conspicuous Union of Evangelical Churches. The movement continues with regular worship at 16 remaining chapels in Essex and London. Some of the traditional distinctive features mentioned have been abandoned, so that UEC churches today are similar to other Evangelical churches.

The UEC maintains its structure as a connection of churches, but is associated with the Fellowship of Independent Evangelical Churches and Affinity. It has its central office at Eastwood Road Evangelical Church, 36 Eastwood Road, Rayleigh, Essex SS6 7JQ.

The 16 UEC churches are in Camberwell,in London, and Canning Town, Chelmsford, Corringham, Cressing, Daws Heath, Eastwood, Great Wakering, Little Totham, Rayleigh, Shoeburyness, Southend, Stanford-le-Hope, Stanway, Wickford and Witham in Essex.

Although services had previously been discontinued at Rayleigh, Shoeburyness, and Stanford-le-Hope and the churches temporarily closed, all three are now home to regular worshipping congregations once again.

References

External links 

Union of Evangelical Churches website
History of the Peculiar Peoples Churches in Eastern Essex

Methodism in the United Kingdom
1838 establishments in England
Religious organisations based in England
Religious organizations established in 1838